Portrait of Countess Potocka is an oil on canvas painting by German artist Franz Xaver Winterhalter, created in 1854. He was at the time one of the foremost portraitists of Europe's royalty and aristocracy. It is held in the National Museum, in Warsaw.

History and description
Winterhalter was a painter who received many commissions from the various European courts and therefore also from the aristocracy of his time. The pictured, Countess Potocka (1825-1907), belonged to the wealthy nobility of Poland and was a member of the Branicki family. She was born Katarzyna Countess Branicka and in 1847 married Adam Józef Count Potocki (1815-1872), a member of the Potocki family. The couple had seven children, three of whom were also painted by Winterhalter, including Zofia Potocka and Roza Potocka.

The Countess Potocka is depicted here in an oriental costume in a three-quarter size, in the painter's favorite format, an oval. It was commissioned by her sister, Elzbieta Countess Krasinska née Countess Branicka (1820-1876), who was also painted by Winterhalter. The costume is taken from the exile the couple had spent in the Middle East after Adam Potocka was accused, incorrectly, of an 1848 bombing. Winterhalter follows the examples from the 18th century when such a costume was more common and worn at costume balls.

Winterhalter made at least three portraits of Countess Potocka in the period 1854 to 1858. The whereabouts of the third portrait is unknown and it has presumably been lost. The second is also in Warsaw. A copy of this oriental portrait is in the possession of the French Château Montrésor.

Provenance
The portrait belonged to the Potocki family and hung in Krzeszowice's Potocki Palace . In 1946 it was acquired by the Warsaw National Museum.

References

1854 paintings
Paintings by Franz Xaver Winterhalter
Portraits of women
Paintings in the collection of the National Museum, Warsaw